The following list sorts companies with the highest expenditures for research and development (R&D) for different years, mostly taken from the magazine Strategy+Business.

2020 top 10 
The 10 companies with the highest research and development expenses in 2020.

2018 top 50 
The 50 companies with the highest research and development expenses in 2018.

2017 top 20 
The 20 companies with the highest research and development expenses in 2017 according to the Global Innovation 1000.

2014 top 20 
The 20 companies with the highest research and development expenses in 2014 according to the Global Innovation 1000.

2011 top 20 
The 20 companies with the highest research and development expenses in 2011 according to the Global Innovation 1000.

2008 top 20 
The 20 companies with the highest research and development expenses in 2008 according to the Global Innovation 1000.

References 

research and development spending